Hanumanthulagudem is a village in Krishna District in the Indian state of Andhra Pradesh. It is located in Nuzvid mandal of Nuzvid revenue division.

References 

Villages in Krishna district